The 2018 Campeonato Mineiro was the 104th season of Mineiro's top professional football league. The competition began on January 17 and ended on April 8. Atlético was the defending champions but was beaten in the final by its longtime rival Cruzeiro, that conquered its 37th title and became the defending champions.

Format

First stage 
The 2018 Módulo I first stage was played by 12 clubs in a single round-robin, with all teams playing each other once. The eight best-placed teams qualified for the final stage and the last two teams were relegated to the 2019 Módulo II.

The league also selects Minas Gerais's representatives in the Campeonato Brasileiro Série D and the Copa do Brasil. The two best placed teams not already qualified to the 2018 seasons of the Série A, Série B or Série C, earns the spots to the 2018 Série D. The three best-placed teams qualify for the 2019 Copa do Brasil.

Knockout stage 
The knockout stage was played between the 8 best-placed teams from the previous stage, with the quarterfinals played in a one-legged tie and the semifinals and finals played in a two-legged tie. The quarterfinals were played necessarily at the best-placed team's home. The first best-placed team played against the eighth best-placed, the second against the seventh and so on. In the semifinals, the best-placed team in the first stage in each contest have the right to choose whether to play its home game in the first or second leg. The best-placed team in the first stage of each contest could win it with two ties.

Participating teams

First stage

Knockout stage

Bracket

Quarterfinals

Semifinals

First leg

Second leg

Finals

First leg

Second leg

Goalscorers

References

External links
 Campeonato Mineiro Official Website

Campeonato Mineiro seasons
Mineiro